Mangala Narlikar is an Indian mathematician who has done research in pure mathematics as well as written for a lay audience. After her degrees in mathematics, she initially worked at the Tata Institute of Fundamental Research (TIFR) in Mumbai and later worked as a lecturer in the University of Bombay and Pune.

Biography
Narlikar studied from the University of Bombay and received degrees of B. A. (Maths) in 1962 and M.A. (Maths) in 1964 with first rank and also won the Chancellor's gold medal. She married, Jayant Narlikar, a well known cosmologist and physicist, in 1966. They have three daughters, Geeta, Girija and Leelavati, all of whom have pursued careers in science; one (Geeta) is a Professor of Biochemistry at the University of California, San Francisco, and the other two are in computer science.
  
From 1964 to 1966 Narlikar worked as a Research Student and Research Associate in the School of Mathematics of the Tata Institute of Fundamental Research, Mumbai. From 1967 to 1969 she taught the undergraduate school  at the University of Cambridge. From 1974 to 1980 she again worked in the School of Mathematics of TIFR. She obtained her Ph.D. degree  in mathematics from the University of Bombay, 16 years after her marriage, in 1981 on the subject of analytic number theory. After obtaining her doctoral degree, she continued to work with TIFR from 1982 to 1985 as a Pool Officer in the School of Mathematics. Her teaching assignments from 1982 to 1985 was for M Phil class in the Department of Mathematics in the University of Bombay. She also taught at intervals in the Department of Mathematics at the University of Pune from 1989 to 2002 and taught M Sc students at the centre in Bhaskaracharya Pratishthan from 2006 to 2010.

Narlikar's core fields of interest are real and complex analysis, analytic geometry, number theory, algebra, and topology.

On writing books on mathematics, Narlikar wrote: "I enjoyed writing a book on how to make mathematics interesting and accessible". On her combining her profession with looking after the household functions she wrote: "My story is perhaps a representation of the lives of many women of my generation who are well educated but always put household responsibilities before their personal careers".

Publications
Narlikar has published a number of scientific papers and books which included:

Papers 
Theory of Sieved Integers, Acta Arithmetica 38, 157 in 19
 On a theorem of Erdos and Szemeredi, Hardy Ramanujan Journal 3, 41, in 1980
On the Mean Square Value theorem of Hurwitz Zeta function, Proceedings of Indian Academy of Sciences 90, 195, 1981.
Hybrid mean Value Theorem of L-functions, Hardy Ramanujan  Journal 9, 11 - 16, 1986.
On orders solely of Abelian Groups,  Bulletin of London  Mathematical Society, 20, 211 - 216, in 1988.
 several articles on mathematics in Science Age, to create interest in mathematics among lay people

Books
 Ganitachyaa Sopya Vata, a book in Marathi for schoolchildren
An Easy Access to Basic Mathematics, a book for schoolchildren.
A Cosmic Adventure, translation of a book on Astronomy by Professor J. V. Narlikar.

References

Bibliography

Living people
20th-century Indian mathematicians
Indian women mathematicians
Scientists from Mumbai
20th-century Indian women scientists
20th-century women mathematicians
1943 births